Sinchi Roca, Sinchi Rocca, Cinchi Roca (in Hispanicized spellings), Sinchi Ruq'a or Sinchi Ruq'a Inka (Quechua for "valorous generous Inca") was the second Sapa Inca of the Kingdom of Cusco (beginning around 1230 CE, though as early as 1105 CE according to some) and a member of the Hurin dynasty (first dynasty).

Family
Said to have been the son of two of the original Inca siblings, Manco Capac and Mama Ocllo, whom they conceived in Huaynacancha. He was Manco Capac's successor and continued the rule after his father's death.

The father of Lloque Yupanqui.

His wife was Mama Cura, of the lineage Sanu, daughter of Sitic-huaman.  They had a son named Sapaca.  Manco Capac, Mama Huaco, Sinchi Rocca, and Manco Sapaca erected the House of the Sun.

Reign
The Kingdom of Cuzco later became Tahuantinsuyu (Inca empire) under the rule of Pachacuti. In one of the Inca foundation myths, Sinchi Roca led his family to the valley of Cuzco.

He is said to have created a territorial division of his domains and is considered to be the initiator of the first census of the Inca population.

He also ordered all members of his ethnic group (Inca) to pierce their ears as a sign of nobility.

The 16th century Spanish writers, including Cabello de Balboa quoted by María Rostworowski, also affirm that Sinchi Roca would have been the first Inca to use Mascapaicha or Maskaypacha (Quechua: Mask'ay seek; Pacha land, world, or space-time), which would become the distinctive sign of Inca sovereignty. Among the Incas, the imperial crown was composed of several elementsː the mascapaicha, the most important, was a fringe of red wool, ordered on the forehead because each of its strands "passed through a small tube of gold". Above this fringe were two or three black and white feathers of the sacred bird Korekenke (or Andean mountain caracara ). This fringe and feathers were secured on the forehead by a turban or headband known as the llautu or llauto consisting of a multicoloured braid "of extremely fine vicuña wool", wrapped several times around the head. The mascapaicha was the mark of absolute imperial power, to the point that "to take" or "to gird the mascapaicha" or "to claim the scarlet fringe" was the periphrase in use to signify the coming of the new emperor or Sapa Inca, during a ceremony where he received it from the hands of the Willaq Umu, the high priest or pontiff of the Inca religion.

One of the stories told about Sinchi Roca was that during his reign a llama shepherd had entered his house and took a young woman whom he cherished very well. The Inca then had them captured and tortured him to tell why he had committed such a sin; the young woman, not wanting to see the villager tortured anymore, revealed that she had fallen in love with the llamamichi (shepherd of llamas) as soon as he saw him wearing a wacanqui (amulet of love), and the shepherd confessed, in turn, that he had received such an object from a demon in a cave.

Building program 
The chronicler Pedro Cieza de León states that Sinchi Roca built terraces and imported enormous quantities of soil in order to improve the fertility of the valley.

Sinchi came to be used as the title for a warlord, while Cápac, one of his father's names, became the title for a sovereign.

References 

Inca emperors
13th-century monarchs in South America
Year of death unknown
Year of birth unknown